The Arkansas Inland Maritime Museum is a maritime museum located at 120 Riverfront Park Drive, North Little Rock, Arkansas which opened on May 15, 2005. The museum includes artifacts from the nuclear-powered cruiser , including the ship's bell and anchor, which are on public display.

The submarine was eventually transferred to the Turkish Navy (serving as TCG Muratreis until 2001) before returning to the US to become a museum ship. It is arguably the longest-serving submarine still existing in the world, and was commissioned by the United States and Turkey for 57 years of active duty (Taiwan has two World War II-era submarines that have been continuously in service since 1945 and 1946 first with the US Navy and then the Republic of China Navy, which are ROCS Hai Shih and ROCS Hai Pao). The museum provides tours of Razorback and even offers sleepovers on the submarine.

, a US Navy tugboat, which survived and responded to the Attack on Pearl Harbor, was acquired by the museum on 28 November 2015.

The museum has vessels that are bookends for the US in World War II, with Hoga from the beginning of the war at Pearl Harbor, alongside Razorback which was present in Tokyo Bay at the surrender of Japan.

See also
List of maritime museums in the United States

References

External links
 

Maritime museums in Arkansas
Museums in Pulaski County, Arkansas
Military and war museums in Arkansas
2005 establishments in Arkansas
Buildings and structures in North Little Rock, Arkansas
Museums established in 2005